Dying Young is a 1991 American romance film directed by Joel Schumacher. It is based on a novel of the same name by Marti Leimbach, and stars Julia Roberts and Campbell Scott with Vincent D'Onofrio, Colleen Dewhurst, David Selby, and Ellen Burstyn. The original music score was composed by James Newton Howard, with the main song "Theme from Dying Young" performed by American saxophonist Kenny G.

Plot
Hilary O'Neil is a beautiful, outgoing yet cautious young woman who has had little luck in work or love. After recently parting ways with her boyfriend when she caught him cheating, Hilary finds herself living with her eccentric mother. One day, Hilary answers an ad in a newspaper for a nurse only to find herself being escorted out before the interview starts.

Victor Geddes is a well-educated, rich, and shy 28-year-old. As the film progresses, Victor's health worsens progressively, due to leukemia. Despite his father's protests, Victor hires Hilary to be his live-in caretaker while he undergoes a traumatic course of chemotherapy. Hilary becomes insecure of her ability to care for Victor after her first exposure to the side effects of his chemotherapy treatment. She researches leukemia and stocks healthier food in the kitchen.

Victor is "finished" with his chemotherapy and suggests they take a vacation to the coast. They rent a house and Hilary begins to feel that she is no longer needed to care for him. They fall in love and continue living at the coast. Victor hides his use of morphine to kill the pain. During dinner with one of the friends they made at the coast, Victor starts acting aggressively and irrationally. He collapses and is helped to bed. Hilary searches the garbage and discovers his used syringes. She confronts him and he admits he was not finished with his chemotherapy. Victor explains that he wants quality in his life and Hilary says that he has been lying to her. She calls his father, who comes to take him home, but Victor wants to stay for one last Christmas party. Hilary and Victor reconnect at the party and he tells her that he is leaving with his father to go back to the hospital in the morning.

After speaking with Victor's father, who says Victor wants to spend one night alone before leaving, Hilary goes back to the house they rented only to find Victor packing clothes, ready to run away and not go with his father to the hospital. Hilary confronts him about running away and Victor admits that he is afraid of hoping. At this confession, Hilary finally tells Victor she loves him and they then decide to go back to the hospital, where he will fight for his life with Hilary. The last scene of the film shows Victor and Hilary leaving the house, which has a small picture of Gustav Klimt's Adam and Eve (the first painting Victor shows Hilary) in the window.

Cast
 Julia Roberts as Hilary O'Neil
 Campbell Scott as Victor Geddes
 Vincent D'Onofrio as Gordon
 Colleen Dewhurst as Estelle Whittier
 Ellen Burstyn as Mrs. O'Neil
 David Selby as Richard Geddes
 George Martin as Malachi
 A.J. Johnson as Shauna

Music
The original music score was composed by James Newton Howard, with the main song "Theme from Dying Young" performed by American saxophonist Kenny G, it was nominated for a Best Pop Instrumental Performance. The soundtrack was released on July 2, 1991 by Arista Records.

Reception
Prior to its original 1991 release, Premiere magazine predicted the film to be the highest-grossing movie that summer.

Dying Young grossed $33.6 million domestically and $48.6 million internationally, for a worldwide total of $82.2 million.

Critical response
The film earned mainly negative reviews from critics. On Rotten Tomatoes the film has an approval rating of 25% based on 40 reviews with the following consensus: "Dyings easy; it's making audiences care about the romance at the heart of this inert drama that proves difficult." Audiences surveyed by CinemaScore gave the film a grade of "B+" on scale of A+ to F.

Roger Ebert gave the film 2/4 and wrote: "Dying Young is a long, slow slog of a movie, up to its knees in drippy self-pity as it marches wearily toward its inevitable ending." Variety magazine wrote: "Julia's hot; Dying Young is lukewarm."

The film was nominated for 3 MTV Movie Awards at the 1992 MTV Movie Awards: 'Best Female Performance' and 'Most Desirable Female' for Julia Roberts, and 'Best Breakthrough Performance' for Campbell Scott.

References

External links
 
 
 
 
 Dying Young production notes

1991 films
1991 romantic drama films
1990s American films
1990s English-language films
20th Century Fox films
American romantic drama films
Films about cancer
Films based on American novels
Films based on romance novels
Films directed by Joel Schumacher
Films scored by James Newton Howard